Randilonnu is a 1978 Indian Malayalam film,  directed by A. S. Prakasam. The film stars Sukumaran, Ravi Menon, Ushakumari and Jayageetha in the lead roles. The film has musical score by M. S. Viswanathan.

Cast

Sukumaran
Ravi Menon
Ushakumari
Jayageetha
Chandralekha
Sadhana
Kaviyoor Ponnamma
KPAC Lalitha
Prathapachandran
Kunchan
Sankaradi
Master Sunil
Master Rajan

Soundtrack
The music was composed by M. S. Viswanathan and the lyrics were written by Mankombu Gopalakrishnan.

References

External links
 

1978 films
1970s Malayalam-language films
Films scored by M. S. Viswanathan